Major General Edwin Davies Patrick (January 11, 1894 – March 15, 1945) was an American general who was the commander of the 6th Infantry Division during World War II.

Biography
He was born January 11, 1894, in Tell City Perry County, Indiana, was the son of John Thomas Patrick and Anna Elnore Menninger, sister of Carl Frederick Menninger, founder of the Menninger Clinic. Patrick was raised in Tell City, Indiana, and was commissioned a 2nd Lieutenant in the Indiana National Guard in 1915, following his graduation from college versus being commissioned via the United States Military Academy.

With the US intervention in World War I Patrick joined the 14th Machine Gun Battalion of the 5th Division and fought in France with the American Expeditionary Forces in the Saint-Mihiel and Meuse-Argonne offensives.

World War II 

During World War II, Patrick served on the staff of Admiral William Halsey for a brief period and then became Chief of Staff of general Walter Krueger's 6th Army. He was the commander of the task forces in the battles of Wakde and Noemfoor. Afterwards, he was given command of the 6th Infantry Division.

During the Philippines campaign of 1944-45 Patrick inspected troops east of Manila on March 14.

Edwin Patrick was one of only three American division commanders to die in combat action in World War II. The other two were Maurice Rose and James Edward Wharton. Patrick was awarded the Distinguished Service Cross. A Navy transport ship, was named in his honor.

References

External links
Edwin D. Patrick on findagrave.com
Generals of World War II

1945 deaths
1894 births
Burials in Indiana
United States Army Infantry Branch personnel
Military personnel from Indiana
United States Army personnel of World War I
Recipients of the Distinguished Service Cross (United States)
United States Army generals
United States Army personnel killed in World War II
People from Tell City, Indiana
Deaths by firearm in the Philippines
United States Army generals of World War II
Recipients of the Distinguished Service Medal (US Army)